Calosoma maximowiczi is a species of ground beetle in the subfamily of Carabinae. It was described by A. Morawitz in 1863.

References

maximowiczi
Beetles described in 1863